Sea Elephant is a rural locality in the local government area (LGA) of King Island in the North-west and west LGA region of Tasmania. The 2016 census recorded a population of nil for the state suburb of Sea Elephant.

History 
Sea Elephant was gazetted as a locality in 1971.

Geography
The waters of Bass Strait form the eastern boundary.

Road infrastructure 
Route C202 (Fraser Road) passes to the south. From there, Ridges Road and Sea Elephant Road provide access to the locality.

References

Towns in Tasmania
King Island (Tasmania)